Finland competed at the 2020 Winter Youth Olympics in Lausanne, Switzerland, from 9 to 22 January 2020.

Medalists
Medals awarded to participants of mixed-NOC teams are represented in italics. These medals are not counted towards the individual NOC medal tally.

Alpine skiing

Boys

Girls

Mixed

Biathlon

Boys

Girls

Mixed

Cross-country skiing 

Boys

Girls

Figure skating

One Finnish figure skater achieved quota places for Finland based on the results of the 2019–20 ISU Junior Grand Prix.

Singles

Mixed NOC team trophy

Freestyle skiing 

Slopestyle & Big Air

Ice hockey

Boys' tournament 

Summary
Key:
 OT – Overtime
 GWS – Match decided by penalty-shootout

Team Roster
Thomas Gronlund
Otto Heinonen
Otto Hokkanen
Tuomas Hynninen
Aleksanteri Kaskimaki
Joakim Kemell
Niklas Kokko
Kasper Kulonummi
Elmeri Laakso
Jere Lassila
Topias Leinonen
Tommi Mannisto
Mika Monkkonen
Jani Nyman
Topi Ronni
Otto Salin
Santeri Sulku

Mixed NOC 3x3 tournament 

Boys
Juho Lukkari
Kalle Varis

Girls
Emilia Kyrkko

Nordic combined 

Individual

Ski jumping

Boys

Girls

Snowboarding

Halfpipe, Slopestyle, & Big Air

Speed skating

Four Finnish skaters achieved quota places foi Finland based on the ISU Junior World Cup Speed Skating ranking. 

Boys

Mass Start

Girls

Mixed

See also
Finland at the 2020 Summer Olympics

References 

2020 in Finnish sport
Nations at the 2020 Winter Youth Olympics
Finland at the Youth Olympics